Intelligent Hoodlum is the debut studio album by the American rapper Intelligent Hoodlum, later known as Tragedy Khadafi. It was released on A&M Records in 1990.

It peaked at number 52 on the Billboard Top R&B/Hip-Hop Albums chart.

Critical reception
Jon Young, in Trouser Press, wrote that "backed by hard, unadorned beats from ace producer Marley Marl, [Intelligent Hoodlum] leads a furious chant against racism in 'No Justice, No Peace' and bristles with righteous anger on 'Black and Proud.'" In an article titled "The 10 Best Forgotten New York Hip-Hop Records," The Village Voice wrote: "Skeletal, smart, politically literate and seemingly effortless, Intelligent Hoodlum’s (a/k/a Tragedy Khadafi) debut is the stuff of conscious hip-hop dreams."

Track listing

Charts

References

External links
 

1990 debut albums
Tragedy Khadafi albums
Albums produced by Marley Marl
Albums produced by Large Professor
A&M Records albums